Chamber Tehsil is an administrative subdivision (tehsil) of Tando Allahyar District in the Sindh province of Pakistan. The city of Chambar is the capital.

References

Talukas of Sindh
Tando Allahyar District